CHED or "Ched" may refer to:

 Commission on Higher Education (disambiguation)
 CHED (AM), a radio station (630 AM) licensed to Edmonton, Alberta, Canada
 Ched Evans, Welsh footballer
 Ched Myers, American theologian
 Ched Towns, Australian adventurer